The Demons is a 2015 Canadian drama film, written and directed by Philippe Lesage.

Based in part on Lesage's own childhood, the film stars Édouard Tremblay-Grenier as Félix, a ten-year-old boy living with his family in a quiet suburb of Montreal who is prone to excessive worry. As a series of child abductions begins to grip the town, however, his vague and needless fears begin to give way to something much more real.

The film's cast also includes Laurent Lucas, Pascale Bussières, Victoria Diamond, Vassili Schneider, Sarah Mottet, Théodore Pellerin, Bénédicte Décary and Pier-Luc Funk.

The film was shot in August/September 2014 in Montreal and vicinity.

The film premiered in September 2015 at the San Sebastian Film Festival. It was released in the province of Quebec (on 8 screens) on 30 October 2015. In December, the film was announced as part of the Toronto International Film Festival's annual Canada's Top Ten screening series of the ten best Canadian films of the year.

The film was nominated for the 2016 Ingmar Bergman International Debut Award at the Gothenburg Film Festival.

Tremblay-Grenier reprised his role as Félix as a minor character in Lesage's 2018 film Genesis (Genèse).

Awards and nominations

 2015: Critic Award (AQCC) for Best Film, International Competition, Festival of New Cinema, 2015
 2016: Canada's Top Ten, Toronto International Film Festival
 2016: Nomination for Best Film, Gala du Cinema Quebecois
 2016: Nomination for Best Director, Gala du Cinéma Québécois
 2016: Gilles-Carles Award for Best First or Second feature fiction film
 2016: Luc-Perreault Award / AQCC for Best Film from Quebec""
 2016: Nomination for Best Motion Picture, Canadian Screen Awards 2016: Nomination for Best achievement in Directing, Canadian Screen Awards 2016: Nomination for The Ingmar Bergman International Debut Award 2016: Titanic Award for Best Film, International Competition, Budapest 2016: Golden Gate New Director Prize'', San Francisco International Film Festival

References

External links 
 

2015 films
Films shot in Montreal
Canadian coming-of-age drama films
Quebec films
Films set in Montreal
2010s coming-of-age drama films
2015 directorial debut films
2015 drama films
French-language Canadian films
2010s Canadian films